Abortion in Europe varies considerably between countries and territories due to differing national laws and policies on its legality, availability of the procedure, and alternative forms of support for pregnant women and their families.

In most European countries, as illustrated in the map and in the country-by-country table below, abortion is generally permitted within a term limit below fetal viability (e.g. 12 weeks in Germany and Italy, or 14 weeks in France and Spain).  The most extensive term limits are in the United Kingdom and in the Netherlands, both at 24 weeks of gestation.

Grounds for abortion are highly restricted in Poland and in the smaller jurisdictions of Monaco,
Liechtenstein and the Faroe Islands. Abortion is prohibited (as an intentional action to cause a miscarriage) in Andorra and Malta. However, abortions are de facto allowed in both countries to save the life of the pregnant woman through observance of the principle of double effect.

History
Debates around abortion, pregnancy and the beginning of life were common in Greek and Roman philosophy and medicine, and would have also been known in cultures which have not left a written record. The medical writer Soranus of Ephesus wrote in the early 2nd century AD:

An early Christian understanding of preventing abortion and infanticide was outlined in the 1st century Didache.

Restrictions on abortion have generally corresponded with laws and societies influenced by the Roman Catholic Christianity or where a substantial number of health professionals refuse to perform abortion due to a personal conscientious objection which is often, but not always, related to religious faith.

Pope John Paul II outlined Catholic teaching on abortion and support for a definition of life beginning at conception in his 1995 encyclical Evangelium Vitae and through the 1992 Catechism of the Catholic Church:

Following the Reformation, Protestants also affirmed life before birth and opposed abortion, although individual Protestant churches have adopted differing positions on the grounds on which abortion should or should not be permitted. John Calvin, for example, wrote:

Abortions have taken place either within or outside the law throughout European history, alongside initiatives by opponents of abortion to provide alternatives where a pregnancy is difficult or unwanted.  These have included kinship care by families and friendship circles in every culture, the adoption and fostering of alumni children in Roman society, and the oblation of children who were given into the care of monastic institutions if a family was unable to provide adequate care.
 In the modern era, formal support services have included adoption, fostering and foundling hospitals.

The Russian Soviet Federative Socialist Republic was the first country in Europe to legalise abortion in 1920 and was followed by other Soviet Union republics and by Sweden in 1938. Abortion law became more liberalised in Eastern Europe in the 1950s after the installation of communist regimes across the Eastern Bloc. Liberal abortion laws were introduced in most large Western European countries in the 1960s and 1970s, one of the first of which being the Abortion Act 1967 in Great Britain for example.

Current status

European Union 
The Center for Reproductive Rights, an American advocacy organisation, estimates that 95% of European women of reproductive age live in countries which allow for abortions as an elective procedure or for broad social and economic reasons.

Most countries in the European Union allow elective abortions during the first trimester, while Sweden and the Netherlands have more extended time limits. After the first trimester, abortion is generally allowed only under certain circumstances, such as risk to the woman's life or health, fetal defects, or other specific situations that may be related to the circumstances of the conception or the woman's age. For instance, in Austria, second-trimester abortions are allowed only if there is a serious risk to the woman's life, physical health, or mental health (that cannot be averted by other means); serious fetal impairment (physical or mental); or if the woman is under 14 years of age. Some countries, such as Denmark, allow abortion after the first trimester for a variety of reasons, including socioeconomic ones, but the woman needs an authorization to have such an abortion. Similarly, in Finland, technically abortions even just up to 12 weeks require authorization from two doctors (unless special circumstances), but in practice, the authorization is only a rubber stamp and it is granted if the mother simply does not wish to have a baby.

Access to abortion in much of Europe depends not as much on the letter of the law, but on the prevailing social views which lead to the interpretation of the laws. In much of Europe, laws which allow a second-trimester abortion due to mental health concerns (when it is deemed that the woman's psychological health would suffer from the continuation of the pregnancy) have come to be interpreted very liberally, while in some areas it is difficult to have a legal abortion even in the early stages of pregnancy due to conscientious objection by doctors refusing to perform abortions against their personal moral or religious convictions.

Abortion in Italy was legalized in 1978. However, the law allows health professionals to refuse to perform an abortion. This conscientious objection has the practical effect of restricting access to abortion.

In Ireland, before December 2018, abortion was illegal except in cases where a woman's life was endangered by the continuation of her pregnancy. However, in a 2018 referendum a large majority of Irish citizens voted to repeal the constitutional amendment prohibiting legislation relating to the termination of non-life-threatening pregnancies; and the new law enacted (the Health (Regulation of Termination of Pregnancy) Act 2018) allows abortion on request up to 12 weeks of pregnancy, and in certain circumstances at later stages. Abortion in Northern Ireland was decriminalized on 22 October 2019.

Europe's formerly Communist countries have liberal abortion laws. The only exception is Poland, where abortion is allowed only in cases of risk to the life or health of the woman or when the pregnancy is a result of rape or incest. Abortion in case of fetal defects, which was previously legal, was ruled unconstitutional by the country's Constitutional Tribunal on 22 October 2020. United Nations independent human rights experts criticized the ruling, and called for the Polish authorities to respect the rights of people who were protesting against it. The ruling took effect on 27 January 2021.

Most European countries have laws that stipulate that minor girls need their parents' consent or that the parents must be informed of the abortion. In most of these countries, however, this rule can be circumvented if a committee agrees that the girl may be placed at risk if her parents find out about the pregnancy, or that otherwise, it is in her best interests to not notify her parents. The interpretation in practice of these laws depends from region to region, as with the other abortion laws. Some countries differentiate between younger pregnant minors and older ones, with the latter not subjected to parental restrictions (for example under or above 16).

In countries where abortion is illegal or restricted, it is common for women to travel to neighbouring countries with more liberal laws. It was estimated in 2007 that over 6,000 Irish women traveled to Great Britain to have abortions every year.

Abortion laws by country 

In most European countries, there is a term limit before which abortion is more easily available in law than afterwards. This can include allowing for an abortion on request, without a medical indication by the pregnant woman. The grounds on which abortion is, or is not, permitted vary considerably according to national laws and policies.

See also

References

 
Abortion law